Acacia brachypoda, known colloquially as western wheatbelt wattle or Chinocup wattle, is an endangered species of Acacia restricted to a small locality in western Australia's wheatbelt.

Description
The glabrous green phyllodes are erect on the stem and straight to slightly incurved. They appear circular in cross section and have four visible nerves or flattened with one nerve. It blooms between May and July producing yellow flowers. Flowers heads have a globular shape with two situated on each leaf axil.

Taxonomy
The species was first formally described by the botanist Bruce Maslin in 1990 as part of the work Acacia Miscellany. Three new Western Australian species with affinities to A. wilhelmiana (Leguminosae: Mimosoideae: Section Plurinerves) from Western Australia as published in the journal Nuytsia. It was reclassified as Racosperma brachypodum by Leslie Pedley in 2003 then transferred back to the genus Acacia in 2006.

Distribution
The shrub is endemic to a small area between Beverley, Brookton and York in the Wheatbelt region of Western Australia where it is found in damp low-lying areas such as swamps where it grows in sandy-clay or loam soils. There are six populations of the wattle that are found in two main areas with an estimated 5000 recorded individuals remaining. One of the populations is found within the Wandoo National Park while the others are along roadsides and in railway reserve remnants. It is found in open woodland communities as part of a dense understorey. It is commonly associated with Eucalyptus wandoo or species of Allocasuarina, Callistemon phoeniceum, Hakea varia, species of Leptospermum and species of Melaleuca.

Conservation status
The species was list as endangered in 2008 under the Environment Protection and Biodiversity Conservation Act 1999 and was previously also listed as endangered under Schedule 1 of the Endangered Species Protection Act 1992 In Western Australia it listed as rare flora under the Wildlife Conservation Act 1950 (Western Australia) and appears on the Wildlife Conservation (Rare Flora) Notice 2006. In 2012 the species was listed as endangered on the IUCN red list.

See also
List of Acacia species

References

brachypoda
Fabales of Australia
Acacias of Western Australia
Plants described in 1990
Taxa named by Bruce Maslin